A wild fishery is a natural body of water with a sizeable free-ranging fish or other aquatic animal (crustaceans and molluscs) population that can be harvested for its commercial value.  Wild fisheries can be marine (saltwater) or lacustrine/riverine (freshwater), and rely heavily on the carrying capacity of the local aquatic ecosystem.

Wild fisheries are sometimes called capture fisheries. The aquatic life they support is not artificial controlled in any meaningful way and needs to be "captured" or fished. Wild fisheries exist primarily in the oceans, and particularly around coasts and continental shelves, but also exist in lakes and rivers. Issues with wild fisheries are overfishing and pollution. Significant wild fisheries have collapsed or are in danger of collapsing, due to overfishing and pollution. Overall, production from the world's wild fisheries has levelled out, and may be starting to decline.

As a contrast to wild fisheries, farmed fisheries can operate in sheltered coastal waters, in rivers, lakes and ponds, or in enclosed bodies of water such as pools or fish tanks. Farmed fisheries are technological in nature, and revolve around developments in aquaculture. Farmed fisheries are expanding, and Chinese aquaculture in particular is making many advances.  Nevertheless, the majority of fish consumed by humans continues to be sourced from wild fisheries.  As of the early 21st century, fish is humanity's only significant wild food source.

Marine and inland production

According to the Food and Agriculture Organization (FAO), the world harvest by commercial fisheries in 2010 consisted of 88.6 million tonnes of aquatic animals captured in wild fisheries, plus another 0.9 million tons of aquatic plants (seaweed etc.). This can be contrasted with 59.9 million tonnes produced in fish farms, plus another 19.0 million tons of aquatic plants harvested in aquaculture.

Marine fisheries

Topography

Ocean currents

Gyres and upwelling

Biomass

Habitats

Coastal waters

Continental shelves

Coral reefs

Open sea

Seamounts

Maritime species

Freshwater fisheries

Lakes

Worldwide, freshwater lakes have an area of 1.5 million square kilometres. Saline inland seas add another 1.0 million square kilometres. There are 28 freshwater lakes with an area greater than 5,000 square kilometres, totalling 1.18 million square kilometres or 79 percent of the total.

Rivers

Pollution

Pollution is the introduction of contaminants into an environment. Wild fisheries flourish in oceans, lakes, and rivers, and the introduction of contaminants is an issue of concern, especially as regards plastics, pesticides, heavy metals, and other industrial and agricultural pollutants which do not disintegrate rapidly in the environment. Land run-off and industrial, agricultural, and domestic waste enter rivers and are discharged into the sea. Pollution from ships is also a problem.

Plastic waste

Marine debris is human-created waste that ends up floating in the sea. Oceanic debris tends to accumulate at the centre of gyres and coastlines, frequently washing aground where it is known as beach litter. Eighty percent of all known marine debris is plastic - a component that has been rapidly accumulating since the end of World War II. Plastics accumulate because they don't biodegrade as many other substances do; while they will photodegrade on exposure to the sun, they do so only under dry conditions, as water inhibits this process.

Discarded plastic bags, six pack rings and other forms of plastic waste which finish up in the ocean present dangers to wildlife and fisheries. Aquatic life can be threatened through entanglement, suffocation, and ingestion.

Nurdles, also known as mermaids' tears, are plastic pellets typically under five millimetres in diameter, and are a major contributor to marine debris. They are used as a raw material in plastics manufacturing, and are thought to enter the natural environment after accidental spillages. Nurdles are also created through the physical weathering of larger plastic debris. They strongly resemble fish eggs, only instead of finding a nutritious meal, any marine wildlife that ingests them will likely starve, be poisoned and die.

Many animals that live on or in the sea consume flotsam by mistake, as it often looks similar to their natural prey.  Plastic debris, when bulky or tangled, is difficult to pass, and may become permanently lodged in the digestive tracts of these animals, blocking the passage of food and causing death through starvation or infection. Tiny floating particles also resemble zooplankton, which can lead filter feeders to consume them and cause them to enter the ocean food chain. In samples taken from the North Pacific Gyre in 1999 by the Algalita Marine Research Foundation, the mass of plastic exceeded that of zooplankton by a factor of six. More recently, reports have surfaced that there may now be 30 times more plastic than plankton, the most abundant form of life in the ocean.

Toxic additives used in the manufacture of plastic materials can leach out into their surroundings when exposed to water. Waterborne hydrophobic pollutants collect and magnify on the surface of plastic debris, thus making plastic far more deadly in the ocean than it would be on land. Hydrophobic contaminants are also known to bioaccumulate in fatty tissues, biomagnifying up the food chain and putting great pressure on apex predators. Some plastic additives are known to disrupt the endocrine system when consumed, others can suppress the immune system or decrease reproductive rates.

Toxins

Apart from plastics, there are particular problems with other toxins which do not disintegrate rapidly in the marine environment. Heavy metals are metallic chemical elements that have a relatively high density and are toxic or poisonous at low concentrations. Examples are mercury, lead, nickel, arsenic and cadmium. Other persistent toxins are PCBs, DDT, pesticides, furans, dioxins and phenols.

Such toxins can accumulate in the tissues of many species of aquatic life in a process called bioaccumulation. They are also known to accumulate in benthic environments, such as estuaries and bay muds: a geological record of human activities of the last century.

Some specific examples are
 Chinese and Russian industrial pollution such as phenols and heavy metals in the Amur River have devastated fish stocks and damaged its estuary soil.
 Wabamun Lake in Alberta, Canada, once the best whitefish lake in the area, now has unacceptable levels of heavy metals in its sediment and fish.
 Acute and chronic pollution events have been shown to impact southern California kelp forests, though the intensity of the impact seems to depend on both the nature of the contaminants and duration of exposure.
 Due to their high position in the food chain and the subsequent accumulation of heavy metals from their diet, mercury levels can be high in larger species such as bluefin and albacore. As a result, in March 2004 the United States FDA issued guidelines recommending that pregnant women, nursing mothers and children limit their intake of tuna and other types of predatory fish.
 Some shellfish and crabs can survive polluted environments, accumulating heavy metals or toxins in their tissues. For example, mitten crabs have a remarkable ability to survive in highly modified aquatic habitats, including polluted waters. The farming and harvesting of such species needs careful management if they are to be used as a food.

 Mining has a poor environmental track record.  For example, according to the United States Environmental Protection Agency, mining has contaminated portions of the headwaters of over 40% of watersheds in the western continental US. Much of this pollution finishes up in the sea.

 Heavy metals enter the environment through oil spills - such as the Prestige oil spill on the Galician coast - or from other natural or anthropogenic sources.

Eutrophication

Eutrophication is an increase in chemical nutrients, typically compounds containing nitrogen or phosphorus, in an ecosystem. It can result in an increase in the ecosystem's primary productivity (excessive plant growth and decay), and further effects including lack of oxygen and severe reductions in water quality, fish, and other animal populations.

The biggest culprit are rivers that empty into the ocean, and with it the many chemicals used as fertilizers in agriculture as well as waste from livestock and humans. An excess of oxygen depleting chemicals in the water can lead to hypoxia and the creation of a dead zone.

Surveys have shown that 54% of lakes in Asia are eutrophic; in Europe, 53%; in North America, 48%; in South America, 41%; and in Africa, 28%. Estuaries also tend to be naturally eutrophic because land-derived nutrients are concentrated where run-off enters the marine environment in a confined channel. The World Resources Institute has identified 375 hypoxic coastal zones around the world, concentrated in coastal areas in Western Europe, the Eastern and Southern coasts of the US, and East Asia, particularly in Japan. In the ocean, there are frequent red tide algae blooms that kill fish and marine mammals and cause respiratory problems in humans and some domestic animals when the blooms reach close to shore.

In addition to land runoff, atmospheric anthropogenic fixed nitrogen can enter the open ocean. A study in 2008 found that this could account for around one third of the ocean's external (non-recycled) nitrogen supply and up to three per cent of the annual new marine biological production. It has been suggested that accumulating reactive nitrogen in the environment may have consequences as serious as putting carbon dioxide in the atmosphere.

Acidification

The oceans are normally a natural carbon sink, absorbing carbon dioxide from the atmosphere. Because the levels of atmospheric carbon dioxide are increasing, the oceans are becoming more acidic.
The potential consequences of ocean acidification are not fully understood, but there are concerns that structures made of calcium carbonate may become vulnerable to dissolution, affecting corals and the ability of shellfish to form shells.

A report from NOAA scientists published in the journal Science in May 2008 found that large amounts of relatively acidified water are upwelling to within four miles of the Pacific continental shelf area of North America. This area is a critical zone where most local marine life lives or is born. While the paper dealt only with areas from Vancouver to northern California, other continental shelf areas may be experiencing similar effects.

Effects of fishing

Habitat destruction

Fishing nets that have been left or lost in the ocean by fishermen are  called ghost nets, and can entangle fish, dolphins, sea turtles, sharks, dugongs, crocodiles, seabirds, crabs, and other creatures. Acting as designed, these nets restrict movement, causing starvation, laceration and infection, and—in those that need to return to the surface to breathe—suffocation.

Overfishing

Some specific examples of overfishing.

 On the east coast of the United States, the availability of bay scallops has been greatly diminished by the overfishing of sharks in the area.  A variety of sharks have, until recently, fed on rays, which are a main predator of bay scallops.  With the shark population reduced, in some places almost totally, the rays have been free to dine on scallops to the point of greatly decreasing their numbers .
 Chesapeake Bay's once-flourishing oyster populations historically filtered the estuary's entire water volume of excess nutrients every three or four days.  Today that process takes almost a year, and  sediment, nutrients, and algae can cause problems in local waters. Oysters filter these pollutants, and either eat them or shape them into small packets that are deposited on the bottom where they are harmless.
 The Australian government alleged in 2006 that Japan illegally overfished southern bluefin tuna by taking 12,000 to 20,000 tonnes per year instead of their agreed 6,000 tonnes; the value of such overfishing would be as much as US$2 billion.  Such overfishing has resulted in severe damage to stocks. "Japan's huge appetite for tuna will take the most sought-after stocks to the brink of commercial extinction unless fisheries agree on more rigid quotas" stated the WWF. Japan disputes this figure, but acknowledges that some overfishing has occurred in the past.
 Jackson, Jeremy B C et al. (2001) Historical overfishing and the recent collapse of coastal ecosystems Science 293:629-638.

Loss of biodiversity

Each species in an ecosystem is affected by the other species in that ecosystem. There are very few single prey-single predator relationships. Most prey are consumed by more than one predator, and most predators have more than one prey. Their relationships are also influenced by other environmental factors.  In most cases, if one species is removed from an ecosystem, other species will most likely be affected, up to the point of extinction.

Species biodiversity is a major contributor to  the stability of ecosystems. When an organism exploits a wide range of resources, a decrease in biodiversity is less likely to have an impact. However, for an organism which exploit only limited resources, a decrease in biodiversity is more likely to have a strong effect.

Reduction of habitat, hunting and fishing of some species to extinction or near extinction, and pollution tend to tip the balance of biodiversity. For a systematic treatment of biodiversity within a trophic level, see unified neutral theory of biodiversity.

Threatened species
The global standard for recording threatened marine species is the IUCN Red List of Threatened Species. This list is the foundation for marine conservation priorities worldwide. A species is listed in the threatened category if it is considered to be critically endangered, endangered, or vulnerable. Other categories are near threatened and data deficient.

Marine

Many marine species are under increasing risk of extinction and marine biodiversity is undergoing potentially irreversible loss due to threats such as overfishing, bycatch, climate change, invasive species and coastal development.

By 2008, the IUCN had assessed about 3,000 marine species. This includes assessments of known species of shark, ray, chimaera, reef-building coral, grouper, marine turtle, seabird, and marine mammal. Almost one-quarter (22%) of these groups have been listed as threatened.

 Sharks, rays, and chimaeras: are deep water pelagic species, which makes them difficult to study in the wild. Not a lot is known about their ecology and population status. Much of what is currently known is from their capture in nets from both targeted and accidental catch. Many of these slow growing species are not recovering from overfishing by shark fisheries around the world.
 Groupers: Major threats are overfishing, particularly the uncontrolled fishing of small juveniles and spawning adults.
 Coral reefs: The primary threats to corals are bleaching and disease which has been linked to an increase in sea temperatures. Other threats include coastal development, coral extraction, sedimentation and pollution. The coral triangle (Indo-Malay-Philippine archipelago) region has the highest number of reef-building coral species in threatened category as well as the highest coral species diversity. The loss of coral reef ecosystems will have devastating effects on many marine species, as well as on people that depend on reef resources for their livelihoods.
 Marine mammals: include whales, dolphins, porpoises, seals, sea lions, walruses, sea otter, marine otter, manatees, dugong and the polar bear. Major threats include entanglement in ghost nets, targeted harvesting, noise pollution from military and seismic sonar, and boat strikes. Other threats are water pollution, habitat loss from coastal development, loss of food sources due to the collapse of fisheries, and climate change.
 Seabirds: Major threats include longline fisheries and gillnets, oil spills, and predation by rodents and cats in their breeding grounds. Other threats are habitat loss and degradation from coastal development, logging and pollution.
 Marine turtles: Marine turtles lay their eggs on beaches, and are subject to threats such as coastal development, sand mining, and predators, including humans who collect their eggs for food in many parts of the world. At sea, marine turtles can be targeted by small scale subsistence fisheries, or become bycatch during longline and trawling activities, or become entangled in ghost nets or struck by boats.

An ambitious project, called the Global Marine Species Assessment, is under way to make IUCN Red List assessments for another 17,000 marine species by 2012. Groups targeted include the approximately 15,000 known marine fishes, and important habitat-forming primary producers such mangroves, seagrasses, certain seaweeds and the remaining corals; and important invertebrate groups including molluscs and
echinoderms.

Freshwater

Freshwater fisheries have a disproportionately high diversity of species compared to other ecosystems. Although freshwater habitats cover less than 1% of the world's surface, they provide a home for over 25% of known vertebrates, more than 126,000 known animal species, about 24,800 species of freshwater fish, molluscs, crabs and dragonflies, and about 2,600 macrophytes.
Continuing industrial and agricultural developments place huge strain on these freshwater systems. Waters are polluted or extracted at high levels, wetlands are drained, rivers channelled, forests deforestated leading to sedimentation, invasive species are introduced, and over-harvesting occurs.

In the 2008 IUCN Red List, about 6,000 or 22% of the known freshwater species  have been assessed at a global scale, leaving about  21,000 species still to be assessed. This makes clear that, worldwide, freshwater species are highly threatened, possibly more so than species in marine fisheries. However, a significant proportion of freshwater species are listed as data deficient, and more field surveys are needed.

Fisheries management

A recent paper published by the National Academy of Sciences of the USA warns that: "Synergistic effects of habitat destruction, overfishing, introduced species, warming, acidification, toxins, and massive runoff of nutrients are transforming once complex ecosystems like coral reefs and kelp forests into monotonous level bottoms, transforming clear and productive coastal seas into anoxic dead zones, and transforming complex food webs topped by big animals into simplified, microbially dominated ecosystems with boom and bust cycles of toxic dinoflagellate blooms, jellyfish, and disease".

See also
 Fishing by country
 List of harvested aquatic animals by weight
 Ocean fisheries
 Population dynamics of fisheries
 World fish production

Notes

References

 World Ocean Atlas (2005) World ocean database. Retrieved 19 April 2008.
 The Columbia Electronic Encyclopedia (2007) The World Ocean. Retrieved 19 April 2008.
 Jacques, Peter (2006) Globalization and the world ocean Rowman Altamira. 
 Pauly, Daniel; Watson, Reg and Alder, Jackie (2005) Global trends in world fisheries: impacts on marine ecosystems and food security Philosophical transactions of the Royal Society, Volume 360, Number 1453.
 De Young, Cassandra (2007) Review of the state of world marine capture fisheries management FAO, Fisheries Technical Paper 488, Rome. .

External links
 International Nitrogen Initiative: Web site
 Population Distribution within 100 km of Coastlines (2000) World Resources Institute.
 NOAA: Carbon cycle science

Fishing industry